Nils is a Scandinavian given name, a chiefly Norwegian, Danish, Swedish and Latvian variant of Niels, cognate to Nicholas.

People and animals with the given name
Nils Bergström (born 1985), Swedish ice hockey player
Nils Björk (1898–1989), Swedish Army lieutenant general 
Nils Dacke (died 1543), Swedish rebel
Nils-Joel Englund (1907–1995), Swedish cross-country skier
Nils Ericson (1802–1870), Swedish inventor and engineer
Nils Frahm (born 1982), German pianist and producer
Nils Frykdahl, American musician
Nils Grandelius, Swedish chess grandmaster
Nils Gründer (born 1997), German politician
Nils Hald (1897–1963), Norwegian actor
Nils Haßfurther (born 1999), German basketball player
Nils-Göran Holmqvist (born 1943), Swedish politician
Nils Kreicbergs (born 1996), Latvian handball player
Nils Liedholm (1922–2007), Swedish footballer and coach
Nils Lofgren (born 1951), American musician
Nils Lorens Sjöberg (1754-1822), Swedish officer and poet
Nils Mittmann (born 1979), German basketball player
Nils Muižnieks (born 1964), Latvian-American political scientist
Nils Ohlin (1895–1958), Swedish actor
Nils Olav, a penguin in Edinburgh Zoo who is the mascot of the Norwegian Royal Guard
Nils Personne (1918–2013), Swedish Air Force lieutenant general
Nils Petersen (born 1988), German footballer
Nils Sējējs (born 2001), Latvian ice hockey player
Nils-Erik Söderqvist (born 1948), Swedish politician
Nils Trygg (1914–1951), Swedish woodcarver
Nils Lahr (born 1973),  American entrepreneur
Nils Ušakovs (born 1976), Latvian journalist and politician, Mayor of Riga

Fictional characters with the given name
Nils (Fire Emblem), the fictional bard in the Fire Emblem: Rekka no Ken video game
Nils Holgersson, the main character of The Wonderful Adventures of Nils, a novel by Swedish author Selma Lagerlöf
Nils, a character in Double Fines video game Psychonauts
Nils Helstrom, a character in the 1933 film The Son of Kong
Nils Hellstrom, the central character of the 1971 film The Hellstrom Chronicle
Nils Hellstrom, the central character of the 1973 book Hellstrom's Hive by Frank Herbert, inspired by the 1971 film
Nils Krogstad, a central character of the 1879 play A Doll's House by Henrik Ibsen
Nils Jesper, Joan Ferguson's henchman on Wentworth
NILS Statue, a structure in the Splatoon 2: Octo Expansion DLC made by Nintendo.

Latvian masculine given names
Scandinavian masculine given names
Norwegian masculine given names
Swedish masculine given names